The western bluebill (Spermophaga haematina) is a common species of estrildid finch found in Africa. It has an estimated global extent of occurrence of 1,900,000 km2.

It is found in Angola, Benin, Cameroon, Central African Republic, the Republic of Congo, the Democratic Republic of the Congo, Côte d'Ivoire, Equatorial Guinea, Gabon, Gambia, Ghana, Guinea, Guinea-Bissau, Liberia, Mali, Nigeria, Senegal, Sierra Leone and Togo. The IUCN has classified the species as being of least concern.

The male of this species has a red tipped blue bill, and red flanks from the chin to the breast.  They also have a characteristic white-blue eye ring. The female has a blue bill with not as much red at the tip, and face color of either black, washed red or maroon.

References

western bluebill
western bluebill
Taxa named by Louis Jean Pierre Vieillot